The Diocese of Churches for the Sake of Others is a diocese of the Anglican Church in North America. The diocese comprises 53 congregations and church plants in 15 American states. The diocesan headquarters are located in Franklin, Tennessee. The first bishop is Todd Hunter.

History
The Churches for the Sake of Others became a church planting initiative of the Anglican Mission in the Americas in the West coast, in 2008, led by Bishop Todd Hunter, when AMiA was the missionary body of the Province of the Anglican Church of Rwanda in the United States, which it was until December 2011. After AMIA's withdrawal from the Anglican Church of Rwanda, Todd Hunter sought affiliation with ACNA. The Diocese of Churches for the Sake of Others was approved as a diocese-in-formation of ACNA in June 2012 and as a full member diocese at the Provincial Council held in June 2013. The investiture of Todd Hunter took place at the opening worship of ACNA's College of Bishops, at 6 January 2014.

The main purpose of the diocese is church planting. Its five key values are Kingdom, Spirit, Formation, Mission and Sacrament. C4SO is organized into five deaneries, Northern California/Northwest, Southern California, Southeast, Midwest and Texas. The diocese actively collaborates on church plants with other diocesan bishops.

Congregational departures from the ACNA 
In 2021-2022, C4SO experienced the departure of multiple church plants for denominations more theologically liberal than the ACNA. In September 2021, St. Mary of Bethany Parish in Nashville departed C4SO out of disagreement over "the ACNA’s emphasis that the world is in need of a church that is 'always moving forward' to 'extend' and 'advance' God’s rule with 'boot camp' training and preparation." St. Mary's rector joined the Communion of Evangelical Episcopal Churches and said the congregation would discern a call to join this denomination. St. Mary of Bethany leaders also voted to make gay, non-celibate members eligible for church office and later adopted a statement of "full participation" in church sacraments, offices, and activities. The presiding bishop of the CEEC responded that its canons do not permit same-sex marriage. In September 2022, St. Mary's elected a woman in a same-sex marriage to its council. 

In October 2022, Bishop Jennifer Baskerville-Burrows announced that the Table, a C4SO church plant in Indianapolis, had been accepted into the Episcopal Diocese of Indianapolis as a mission church. The congregation's members voted 44 to 4 to join the Episcopal Church. Except for congregations that had been part of TEC dioceses, followed a newly formed ACNA diocese, and then returned during the Anglican realignment, the Table was the first congregation to join TEC from ACNA. "They are committed to being a safe place for LGBTQ people and to joining with us in our work to dismantle systemic racism and discrimination," Baskerville-Burrows wrote. The Table also said it disagreed with the ACNA's stance on women serving as bishops. 

In both cases, Bishop Todd Hunter gave his blessing to the departing congregations and clergy.

References

External links
 

Anglican dioceses established in the 21st century
Anglican realignment dioceses
Dioceses of the Anglican Church in North America